Stuart John Carne  (born 19 June 1926) is a retired medical general practitioner.

Early life and education
Stuart Carne was born in London to Bernard and Millicent Carne. He attended Willesden County Grammar School and graduated from Middlesex Hospital Medical School in 1951.

Personal life
On 16 December 1951, Carne married Yolande Cooper. They have four children and three grandchildren.

Medical career
Carne founded the Grove Health Centre in Goldhawk Road,
Shepherd's Bush, London in 1967, which was opened by the Minister of Health, Kenneth Robinson, and from the start it proved to be a success. At the time, the building was regarded as a model of its kind and the practice is still running at new, modern premises around the corner at Richford Gate.

In 1970, Carne was appointed senior tutor in general practice at the Royal Postgraduate Medical School at Hammersmith Hospital.

Honours and awards
In 1976, Carne was elected president of the World Organization of National Colleges, Academies (WONCA). He was elected president of the Royal College of General Practitioners in 1988, in which role he was succeeded by the Prince of Wales in 1991. He was chairman of the Standing Medical Advisory Committee (1982-1986), chairman of the Joint Committee on Contraception (1983-1986), honorary civil consultant in general practice to the RAF (1974- ), president of the Section of General Practice of the Royal Society of Medicine (1973-1974) and an examiner in medicine at the Society of Apothecaries (1980-1988).

Carne was appointed OBE in 1977 and CBE in 1986.

Other posts
In 1959, Carne became honorary medical officer to the Queens Park Rangers Football Club, a position he held for thirty years until retiring in 1989 when he was appointed vice-president of the club.

Published work
Paediatric Care: Child Health in Family Practice (1976)

References 

Commanders of the Order of the British Empire
Fellows of the Royal College of General Practitioners
People educated at Willesden County Grammar School
Queens Park Rangers F.C. non-playing staff
1926 births
Living people